The pit sword (also known as a rodmeter) is a blade of metal or plastic that extends into the water beneath the hull of a ship. It is part of the pitometer log, a device for measuring the ship's speed through the water.

See also
Electromagnetic log
Pitot tube

References

External links

Historical site with information on US Navy submarine pitometer log systems during World War II. This site shows the pit sword or rodmeter as it is deployed.

Measuring instruments